Tshepo Liphoko (born 21 February 1995) is a South African soccer player who plays as a midfielder for Uthongathi.

Career
Liphoko started his career at Orlando Pirates, and had a loan spell at Lamontville Golden Arrows in 2013. He has since played for AmaZulu, Mbombela United and Uthongathi.

Personal life
In 2015, Liphoko was involved in a car accident alongside team-mate Mbongeni Gumede.

References

Living people
1995 births
South African soccer players
Association football midfielders
Orlando Pirates F.C. players
Lamontville Golden Arrows F.C. players
AmaZulu F.C. players
Mbombela United F.C. players
Uthongathi F.C. players
South African Premier Division players
National First Division players